The discography of the Japanese idol duo Wink consists of 14 studio albums, 11 compilation albums, and 26 singles released since 1988.

Albums

Studio albums

Extended plays

Live albums

Compilations

Box sets

Remix albums

Karaoke albums

Singles

Videography

Music video albums

Live video albums

Footnotes

References 

Discography
Discographies of Japanese artists
Pop music group discographies